William E. Ford (born June 18, 1961) is an American businessman. He is the Chairman and CEO of General Atlantic, a global growth equity firm with $84 billion in assets under management as of November, 2021. He lives in New York City.

Career and education 

Ford has been the chief executive officer of General Atlantic, a leading growth equity firm, since his appointment in 2007. He was made chairman of the firm in 2021. Under his direction, the firm’s assets under management have increased from roughly $12 billion in 2007 to $34 billion as of March 2020. During his tenure as CEO, the firm has also continued its global expansion by opening new offices in Jakarta, Singapore, Beijing, Mexico City, and Shanghai. Additionally, General Atlantic has expanded its sector coverage through the launch of the global Consumer sector team as well as the expansion of the Healthcare sector to include Life Sciences.

In addition to his roles as Chairman and CEO, Ford is chairman of General Atlantic’s Management Committee and is a member of the firm’s Investment and Portfolio Committees.

Ford joined General Atlantic in 1991, having previously worked at Morgan Stanley & Co. as an investment banker. Ford has personally led a number of successful investments during his tenure as CEO of General Atlantic, including First Republic Bank (2010), IHS Markit (2010), NYMEX Holdings (2006), Priceline (1998), and E*Trade (1995).

He serves on the board of General Atlantic portfolio companies ByteDance and Royalty Pharma, in addition to IHS Markit, a former portfolio company and global provider of independent financial data, tools, and infrastructure. He also serves on the board of BlackRock. He has been a director of prior General Atlantic portfolio companies including Tory Burch, First Republic Bank, NYSE Euronext, E*Trade, Priceline, and NYMEX.

Ford received his M.B.A. from the Stanford Graduate School of Business in 1987 and his B.A. in Economics from Amherst College in 1983.

Philanthropy and public positions 

Ford serves as Chair of Rockefeller University and serves on the board of trustees of the Memorial Sloan Kettering Cancer Center. He also serves as Co-Chair of the Partnership for New York City and on the board of directors of the National Committee on United States-China Relations, Emerging Markets Private Equity Association (EMPEA), Endeavor, the McKinsey Advisory Council, and the New York State Life Science Advisory Board. Furthermore, he is a member of the Council on Foreign Relations and a member of the steering committee for The CEO Action for Diversity.

Ford also serves on the advisory board of Tsinghua University's School of Economics and Management. He served as a trustee of Amherst College from 2001-2013 and is a member of the Investment Committee for the College's endowment.

In July 2022, Ford helped found a group of U.S. business and policy leaders who share the goal of constructively engaging with China in order to improve U.S.-China relations.

Awards and recognition 

 Ford was ranked #5 on Forbes Midas List in 2009
 Ford was ranked #6 on Forbes Midas List in 2008

Ford has been interviewed by several publications such as Bloomberg, the Financial Times, Fortune Magazine, American Banker, The Economic Times, British American Business, Forbes, Expansion, Private Equity International, the Silicon Valley Business Journal, and LEADERS Magazine. Ford has also appeared on CNBC with David Faber.

Notes

External links 
 The Rockefeller University homepage
 Partnership for New York City leadership page
 Endeavor board profile
 National Committee on United States-China Relations board page
 Memorial Sloan Kettering Cancer Center (board of Overseers and Managers page)
 The New York Genome Center (supporters page)
 Forbes’ Midas List 2009

1961 births
Amherst College alumni
Private equity and venture capital investors
American philanthropists
American investors
Living people